The Museum District, alternately known as West of the Boulevard, is a neighborhood in the city of Richmond, Virginia. It is anchored by the contiguous six-block tract of museums along the west side of Boulevard, including the Virginia Museum of Fine Arts and the Virginia Museum of History & Culture, hence the name.

It is roughly bounded  by the Boulevard (and the Fan District) on the east, I-195 on the west, Monument Avenue and Broad Street on the north, and Carytown on the south. Much of that is listed as a historic district on the National Register of Historic Places.

Parts of the area had been in active use as farmland into the late 19th century, and though part was notably used as a Civil War veteran's home at that time, it was primarily developed between 1895 and 1940. It is largely populated with townhouses in styles from the late 19th and early 20th centuries.  Though much of the district is residential, there are several schools, religious facilities, and other institutional uses throughout, as well as local restaurants and stores, especially in the "Devil's Triangle" area  Carytown generally serves as the shopping district for the area, and in fact the distinction between Carytown and the Museum District is fairly blurry.

The Devil's Triangle is the largest business district in the neighborhood, outside of the streets adjoining Carytown, but there are many small corner stores and restaurants throughout the neighborhood.

References

External links

 Museum District Civic Association
 Virginia Museum of Fine Arts
 Virginia Museum of History & Culture

Historic districts on the National Register of Historic Places in Virginia
Neighborhoods in Richmond, Virginia
National Register of Historic Places in Richmond, Virginia